The Defence Fire and Rescue Service (DFRS) is the primary firefighting and rescue service protecting British defence estates and property. Along with the Royal Air Force Rescue and Firefighting Service, it forms the Ministry of Defence Fire Services. , the takeover of DFRS by private contractor Capita continues.

History
The Ministry of Defence Fire Service was formed on 1 April 1991 by the amalgamation of the Navy Department Fire Prevention Service, Army Department Fire Service, Air Force Department Fire Service and Procurement Executive Fire Service. It later became part of a similarly named umbrella body, the Ministry of Defence Fire Services, which also included the RAF Firefighting and Rescue Service, a military organisation which protected mainly RAF airfields and runways.

Privatisation
In July 2019, it was announced by the Ministry of Defence that Capita had won an outsourcing contract to manage the operations at 53 sites across the UK, Cyprus and the Falkland Islands. Part of the 12-year £525million contract included the construction and management of an improved training facility for Defence firefighters at the Fire Service College in Gloucestershire, 
which has been owned by Capita since 2013.

, around 600 DFRS personnel have transferred into Capita Fire and Rescue, and improvements at the Fire Service College have been completed.
In addition, 50 new vehicles including Oshkosh High Reach Extendable Turret (HRET) Strikers and Angloco Multi-Purpose Response Vehicles (MPRVs) have been delivered to 11 sites.

Organisation
The Defence Fire and Rescue Service is a civilian organisation, however the term 'Defence Fire' may be used colloquially to include military and civilian firefighting activities.
According to the gov.uk website, the DFR staff include:

Military
Royal Air Force Trade Group 8 firefighter
Royal Navy aircraft handler
Civilian
Civil Service (Defence Fire and Rescue Service)
locally employed civilian and contractor staff.

As DFR is a mixture of people, recruitment and conditions differ, but for civilians wishing to join, they would become civil servants and thus to apply would need to apply via the Civil Service website.

References

External links
 Roger Mardon fire service history
 DFRS Twitter Page

Fire and rescue services of the United Kingdom
Joint military units and formations of the United Kingdom
1991 establishments in the United Kingdom
Military units and formations established in 1991